Hurricane Howard was a powerful Category 4 hurricane which produced large swells along the coasts of the Baja California Peninsula and southern California. The cyclone was the eighth named storm, fourth hurricane, and second major hurricane of the 2004 Pacific hurricane season. Howard originated out of a tropical wave off the coast of Mexico on August 30. Traveling towards the northwest, the storm gradually strengthened, becoming a hurricane on September 1 and reaching its peak intensity the following day with winds of 140 mph (220 km/h). Decreasing sea surface temperatures then caused the storm to weaken. By September 4, Howard was downgraded to a tropical storm. The next day, it degenerated into a non-convective remnant low-pressure area which persisted for another five days before dissipating over open waters.

Although the storm never made landfall, the fringe effects of the storm produced significant flooding across the Baja California Peninsula which damaged agricultural land and dozens of homes. Howard also produced large swells which reached 18 ft (5.4 m) along the Baja coastline and 10 ft (3 m) along the California coastline. About 1,000 lifeguard rescues took place in California due to the waves. Moisture from the storm also enhanced rainfall in parts of Arizona, leading to minor accumulations.

Meteorological history

Hurricane Howard began as a tropical wave that moved off the west coast of Africa on August 18. The wave moved across the Atlantic Ocean and Caribbean with little associated convection. By August 26, the wave produced disorganized convection as it moved through the western Caribbean, across Central America, and entered the eastern Pacific Ocean. Paralleling the southern coast of Mexico, the wave became increasingly organized and it was estimated that the tropical wave spawned a tropical depression around 1200 UTC on August 30 about 400 mi (645 km) south-southwest of Acapulco, Mexico. Classified as Tropical Depression Eleven-E, the system tracked west-northwestward under the steering currents of a weak mid-level ridge. In the hours after formation, the depression lacked a concentration of deep convection near the center. However, conditions favored eventual development, including warm sea surface temperatures and low amounts of wind shear.

Based on increased organization and the formation of banding features, it was estimated that the cyclone intensified into Tropical Storm Howard at 0000 UTC on August 31. A mid-level anticyclone located over southern California was steering the storm towards the northwest. Early on September 1, the National Hurricane Center (NHC) stated that Howard had an 80 percent chance of undergoing rapid intensification based on further development of the storm and a highly favorable environment around the cyclone. Based on the formation of an eye feature, the NHC upgraded Howard to a hurricane early on September 1 while the storm was located about 420 mi (675 km) southwest of Manzanillo, Colima. Later that day, the eye of Howard became apparent on satellite imagery, which organized into a pinhole eye surrounded by a ring of symmetric, deep convection. At 0600 UTC on September 2, Howard was upgraded to a major hurricane—a storm with winds of 111 mph (178 km/h) or higher. Shortly after, the cyclone reached its peak intensity as a low-end Category 4 hurricane on the Saffir–Simpson scale, with winds of 140 mph (220 km/h) while located about 410 mi (660 km) south-southwest of the southern tip of Baja California Sur.

Not long after reaching peak intensity, the storm moved over cooler waters, causing the eyewall to deteriorate and cloud tops to warm. The next day, the eye of Howard disappeared from satellite imagery, leading to the cyclone being downgraded to a Category 2 hurricane. Continued deterioration of the system caused rapid weakening, with Howard being downgraded to a tropical storm by 1200 UTC on September 4. Convection associated with the storm was separated from the center later that day. Early on September 5, Howard was further downgraded to a tropical depression and later degenerated into a non-convective remnant low-pressure area about 265 mi (425 km) west-southwest of Punta Eugenia, Mexico. The remnants of the hurricane continued towards the northwest before turning towards the southwest the following day as it tracked along the southeast side of a ridge of high pressure. The low continued in this general direction until it dissipated on September 10 about 1,150 mi (1,850 km) west of Cabo San Lucas, Mexico.

Preparations and impact
Because Howard remained away from land no tropical cyclone warnings and watches were issued. One ship, the Strong Virginian, reported sustained winds 42 mph (68 km/h) at 0600 UTC on September 4. Along the Baja California Peninsula, 16–18 ft (4.8–5.4 m) swells were reported. All ships were required to remain at port due to the rough seas. Heavy rains in the mountainous and Pacific coastal areas of Baja California produced flooding which washed out several roads in San José del Cabo. The rains did help increase water levels in some reservoirs in Baja California. An estimated 2,000 hectares of agricultural land was damaged by the storm and 48 households were damaged throughout four communities. State and federal authorities purchased temporary homes for those who needed shelter in the affected areas. The State Civil Protection in Mexico provided rehabilitation for a total of 393 homes affected by Howard.

Large swells produced by the storm resulted in about 1,000 lifeguard rescues in Orange County, California. High temperatures in southern California, exceeding 100 °F (37.7 °C) in places, and cool ocean temperatures led to an estimated 575,000 people going to beaches during the Labor Day weekend. One incident required 25 rescues as dozens of people were overwhelmed by 8–10 ft (2.4–3 m) waves. Officials in San Bernardino County advised residents to take precautions for the possibility of flooding as a result of moisture from the remnants of Howard. Following wildfires in 2003, foothills were highly susceptible to flooding. Residents were advised to have sandbags ready, ensure their emergency supplies were stocked and have an evacuation plan. Despite all the preparations undertaken, Howard did not produce any rainfall in California. The moisture also enhanced rainfall across portions of Arizona. This led to minor rainfall accumulations throughout the state.

See also

Timeline of the 2004 Pacific hurricane season
Other tropical cyclones of the same name
List of Category 4 Pacific hurricanes

References

External links

The NHC's advisory archive for Hurricane Howard

Category 4 Pacific hurricanes
2004 Pacific hurricane season
Pacific hurricanes in Mexico
Hurricanes in California
Hurricanes in Arizona
2004 in Mexico
2004 natural disasters in the United States
Tropical cyclones in 2004